Sword Master is a side-scrolling action game developed for the Nintendo Entertainment System. The game is set in medieval fantasy setting and focuses primarily on strategic fighting using shield and sword. The game is also one of the NES games to include parallax scrolling.

Plot
The Sword Master is a knight who was summoned into a kingdom in order to defeat an evil wizard and powerful demon which he summoned. The game follows the knight as he marches through forest, village, and all around the enemy's castle, until both the wizard and the demon are destroyed.

Gameplay
The player must use sword and shield to battle through 7 game levels, from the forest, to a cursed town, to multiple levels of the villain's castle lair. The player encounters giant bats, wolves, skeleton warriors, evil knights, wizards, barbarians, lizard men, gargoyles, and other fierce enemies on his quest. The Sword Master can swing his sword, defend with his shield, and gather power-ups which enable him to change his form. For example, the Sword Master can transform into a mage and cast offensive magic spells.

References

External links

1990 video games
Athena (company) games
Nintendo Entertainment System games
Nintendo Entertainment System-only games
Platform games
Video games developed in Japan
Video games set in castles